Craig Brown (born August 18, 1975) is an American curler.

Born in Madison, Wisconsin, he is one of the top skips in the U.S. He was the skip of the 2000 and 2008 U.S. champion rinks. At the 2000 Ford World Curling Championships, Brown skipped the U.S. team to a fourth-place finish, losing to Finland in the final.

Brown played third on the U.S. team at three World Junior Curling Championships (1994, 1995, 1997). Mike Peplinski skipped the team in 1994 and 1995, while Matt Stevens skipped the team in 1997. Brown won the bronze medal with Peplinski in 1994.

At the 2014 Olympics, Brown played as alternate for the USA team.

Brown attended La Follette High School and is employed by Steve's Curling Supplies.

Teammates
2008 Grand Forks World Championships

Rich Ruohonen, Third
John Dunlop, Second
Peter Annis, Lead
Kevin Kakela, Alternate

References

External links

1975 births
Living people
American male curlers
Sportspeople from Madison, Wisconsin
Curlers at the 2014 Winter Olympics
Olympic curlers of the United States
American curling champions